Heinrich, Prince of Fürstenberg (German: Heinrich Fürst zu Fürstenberg; born 17 July 1950) is a German landowner, businessman and nobleman who is the head of the House of Fürstenberg.

Early years 
Prince Heinrich zu Fürstenberg was born in 1950 at Schloss Heiligenberg in Heiligenberg, Germany. He is the son of Joachim Egon, Prince of Fürstenberg, and Countess Paula von Königsegg-Aulendorf. He studied economics at university in Vienna.

Personal life and family 
In 1976, Prince Heinrich married his second cousin, Princess Maximiliane of Windisch-Graetz, in Rome, Italy. In 1977, their first child, Prince Christian, was born. In 1985, their second child, Prince Antonius, was born.

In 2010, his eldest son married Jeannette Griesel. His younger son married Matilde dei Principi Borromeo Arese Taverna in 2011.

In 2012, he was added to the International Best Dressed Hall of Fame.

Career 
Prince Heinrich's father died in 2002, and he assumed the role as head of the Princely House of Fürstenberg at that time.  He owns and manages the family businesses, which include landholdings and beer brewing.

The Fürstenberg family is the second-largest forest owner in Germany. The family was granted the right to brew beer in 1283 by Rudolf I of Germany and has been in the business ever since. In 2005, Prince Heinrich joined the Fürstenberg Brewery with Brau Holding International.

References 

Living people
1950 births
Fürstenberg (princely family)
German princes
Businesspeople from Baden-Württemberg
German Roman Catholics
Knights of Malta
German landowners